Bangladesh is primarily a low-lying country. The main areas of elevation are the Chittagong Hills in the southeast, the Low Hills of Sylhet in the northeast, and certain highlands in the north and northwest.

Saka Haphong

Saka Haphong is the Tripura tribal name which is the highest peak of Bangladesh.

Zow Tlang/ Reang Haphong 

According to Bangla Trek, it is the second-highest peak in the country, though it has not yet been officially recognized by Bangladesh's government.

The local name comes from the Bawm language. The name 'Zow' refers to 'Mizo', a derivative of Mizoram in India. 'Tlang' means mountain in the Bwam language. The official name, 'Mowdok Mual', comes from American and Russian topographic maps.

Aiyang Tlang 

Rama Manikya Haphong/Aiyang Tlang is another mountain found in Bangladesh nearing the Bangladesh–Myanmar border.

Van Rausang Bawm from the local 'Bawm ethnic community', Dalian headman Para of 'Remakri' Mouja, Thanchi Upozila in the Bandarban district was the one to discover it. On the 13th of November, 2019, Engineer Jyotirmoy Dhar had become the first Bangladeshi to have climbed the mountain.

Dumlong/ Msha Panji Haphong 

In 2011, Wadud Mohosin Rubel alongside his three travel partners Asif Aminur Rashid, Nagib Meshkat and Abdul Haque have claimed the mountain, 'Dumlong/Msha Panji Haphong' to be the second highest mountain in Bangladesh on the basis of measurements made by their Garmin GPS. The height was found at 3,314 ft. (1,010 m). The location was recorded as 22°02′02.1″N 92°35′36.3″E, accurately matching the coordinates given by Google Earth.

A few months after this expedition, a team of Bangladeshi travelers led by Zaqiul Deep measured the height at 3,312 ft. (1,009 m). A third team also reached the summit later led by Fahim Hasan of BD Explorer. There is no doubt about the height of Dumlong but whether it is the second or third highest mountain in the country is yet to be confirmed. Nevertheless, it is indeed the highest peak of Rangamati Hill District and one of only three mountains measured at more than a thousand metres in height.

In 2014, several teams climbed the summit of Zow Tlang, and based on their readings, they surmised Dumlong is the third-highest mountain in Bangladesh.

Keokradong

On the top of Keokradong there is a small shelter and a signboard put up by the Bangladeshi military proclaiming the altitude to be . Garmin GPS recorded  at this location, a different team measured  with  accuracy by GPS, a measurement consistent with Russian topographic mapping and SRTM data. USGS and Russian mapping dispute the claim that this is the location correctly named Keokradong; they show Keokradong at an  summit further north.

Maithaijama Haphong

Located at the south-eastern part of Chittagong hill tracts between the Bangladesh and India border, Maithaijama Haphong is the sixth-highest peak of Bangladesh. However it is not officially recognized according to the Bangladesh government. This peak is also the second-highest peak of Reng Tlang range after Dumlong. Exact Geo location of the highest point was N 22°00.714', E 92°35.863'. The name "Maithai Jama Haphong" came from the Tripura language. which means, "Bad hilly place for vegetation." Stream (Jhiri) route to summit & view from the peak is extraordinary.
 Location: Bilaichori, Rangamati.
 Range: Reng Tlang
 Elevation:  (GPS accuracy: 2 m +/-)
 Position: N 22°00.714', E 92°35.863'
 Measured by: BD Explorer

Thingdawlte Tlang Haphong

Thingdawlte Tlang is a significant peak of Bangladesh. This peak is the highest point of 'lawmbok Row' range and possible seventh-highest of the country. The name of the peak was collected by BD Explorer and confirmed by the local tribal people of Thingdawlte village. The most easiest route to summit this peak is to start from Ruma of Bandarban district. Nearest settlement is known as Thingdawlte (Bawm) village. This peak is named after this village.
 Location: Ruma, Bandarban
 Range: Lawmbok row
 Elevation:  (GPS accuracy 3m +/-) [Possible seventh-highest peak of Bangladesh and highest point of lowmbok Row range]
 Geo position: N 21°54.611', E 092°35.380′ (21.910182, 92.589654)
 Measured by: BD Explorer

Mukhra Thuthai Haphong 

Mukhra Thuthai Haphong is a significant border peak of Bangladesh, situated at the southern most part of Belaichori of Rangamati Hill District. In April 2013, Fahim Hasan of BD Explorer summited and measured this peak for the first time. The name of the peak was collected by BD Explorer and confirmed by the local tribal people of local village. The name Mukhra Thuthai Haphong came from the Tripura language. Nearest settlement is known as Dhupanichora para. The easiest route to summit this peak is to start from Ruma of Bandarban district.
 Location: Belaichori, Rangamati
 Range: Reng Tlang
 Elevation:  (GPS accuracy:  (+/-)
 Position: N 21°58'51.87", E 92°36'12.88"
 Measured by: BD Explorer

Kapital Haphong

Kapital/Capital is a distinctive, beautiful and very eye-catching peak on the Politai range near Thaikeng para. This flat mountain top was once used as a hideout by a separatist group from Mizoram. They declared this mountaintop as their temporary capital of free and independent Mizoram, later moving to another location. The locals nevertheless still call this area the 'Kapital'.
 Location: Ruma, Bandarban
 Range: Politai range
 Elevation: 
 Geo position: N 21°54'2.58", E 92°31'26.68"

Kreikung Taung

Kreikung Taung is a significant peak of Bangladesh. This peak is the second highest point of 'Lawmbok Row' range and possibly the eleventh-highest in the country. The name of the peak was collected by BD Explorer and confirmed by the local tribal people of Thingdawlte village. The most easiest route to summit this peak is to start from Ruma of Bandarban district. Nearest settlement is known as Thingdawlte (Bawm) village.
 Alternative name: Ngaramh Tlang (ন্যারা্ম্ ত্ল্যাং,বম); Kreikung Taung name originated from local Marma language.
 Bengali meaning: মাছ পাহাড়
 Location: Ruma, Bandarban
 Range: Lawmbok row
 Elevation:  (GPS accuracy 2m +/-) [2nd-highest peak of Lowmbok row range]
 Geo location: N 21°55.563', E 092°34.827′
 Measured by: BD Explorer

Sippi Arsuang

Taung Prai

Taung Prai, a very beautiful dome-shaped mountain at Reng Tlang border range is the most south-eastern border peak of Rangamati district. It is also the last major peak at Reng Tlang range inside our border. View seen from the top is mind-blowing. Taung prai is a Marma word. Means "Ulta pahar"(উল্টা পাহাড়).
 Location: Belaichori, Rangamati
 Range: Reng Tlang
 Elevation: (GPS accuracy 3m+/-)
 Nearest village: Kes Pai (Khumi)
 Geo position: 21° 54.176'N 92° 37.611'E
 Measured by: BD Explorer

Tinmukh/Tinmatha pillar is a significant border pillar that marks the meeting point of three countries's borders; Bangladesh, Myanmar and India, located above a peak in between "Mukhra Thuthai Haphong" and "Laisra Haphong".
 Location: Belaichori, Rangamati
 Range: Reng Tlang
 Elevation:  (GPS accuracy 2m +/-)
 Geo position: N21 58.474 E92 36.440

Tazing Dong

Another peak that is sometimes claimed to be the peak of Bangladesh is Tazing Dong (sometimes spelled as Tahjingdong, and also known as Bijoy). It has been claimed to be . Neither Russian topographic mapping nor SRTM data show anything in the area exceeding .

There are three peaks in that area known as Thajindong (Lungphe Tuang in US army 1:250K topo map and Russian 1:200k topo map). A different measurement done by another team using Garmin GPS shows the height of the other peak as 829.66m with 3m accuracy.

List of peaks above

References

Bangladesh
Mountains
Bangladesh